The Changting dialect is a dialect of Tingzhou Hakka mainly spoken in Changting County of northwest Fujian, China. It is generally regarded as the representative dialect of the Hakka spoken in western Fujian province.

References

Hakka Chinese